Tarakan is an island and the largest city of the Indonesian province of North Kalimantan. The island city is located in northern Borneo, midway along the coast of the province. The city boundaries are co-extensive with the island (including a couple of small islands off the coast of the Tarakan Barat District). Once a major oil-producing region during the colonial period, Tarakan had great strategic importance during the Pacific War and was among the first Japanese targets early in the conflict. It is the sole city within the newly established (in 2012) Indonesian province of North Kalimantan. According to Statistics Indonesia, the city had a population of 193,370 at the 2010 Census and 242,786 inhabitants at the 2020 Census.

Geography 

History

Etymology 
According to legends, native Tidungs established their kingdom in Tarakan around 1076 CE. After moving their capital several times over the centuries, in 1571 CE they settled their kingdom on the eastern coast of Tarakan, apparently already under the influence of Islam.

Petroleum 

Dutch explorers noted oil seepages in 1863. In 1905, an oil concession was granted to Koninklijke Nederlandsche Petroleum Maatschappij' a predecessor to Royal Dutch Shell. One year later oil production began with a yield of over 57,928 barrels of oil per year. Production continued to increase and in the 1920s Tarakan yielded over five million barrels a year, a third of the total oil production in the whole of the Dutch East Indies.

The oil produced here had a paraffin base instead of the usual asphalt base. Tarakan oil fields produced a light, sour crude oil with an unusually low pour point. By 1940, the island had an oil refinery with four petroleum loading piers, and was one of the five largest petroleum processing centers in the East Indies.

World War II

Japanese oil fields in Sakhalin and Formosa provided only about ten percent of the petroleum needed to sustain Japanese industry. Reserves of California crude oil at Japanese refineries would have been exhausted in less than two years at the rate of consumption when the United States terminated exports to Japan on 26 July 1941. Japan initiated hostilities against the United States and the United Kingdom four months later in preparation for seizing alternative sources of petroleum in the East Indies. Japan declared war on the Netherlands East Indies on 10 January 1942; and Japanese troops landed on Tarakan the following day.  Dutch forces had declared war on Japan a month earlier, and sabotaged the oil field and refinery prior to surrender.

Japan had captured the Miri oil field in December, and captured oil fields and refineries at Balikpapan in January, Sumatra in February, and Java in March. Oil technicians accompanied the invading troops to maintain production at captured facilities.  A team of one thousand additional petroleum engineers and technicians sailed from Japan aboard the Taiyo Maru, but nearly 800 drowned when the ship was sunk southwest of Kyushu by the USS Grenadier on 8 May 1942.  Despite this loss, Tarakan crude oil (mixed with lesser quantities of Manchurian oil shale distillates) became the primary feedstock for Japanese diesel fuel in 1942, while reserve supplies of California crude oil remained the primary feedstock for Japanese gasoline and residual fuels until 1943.

Tarakan became a Japanese strategic air base from which further attacks could be launched following the Dutch surrender. Tarakan's inhabitants suffered under Japan's occupation. The large number of Japanese troops stationed on the island led to food shortages and many civilians suffered from malnutrition. During the occupation, the Japanese transported some 600 labourers to Tarakan from Java. The Japanese also forced an estimated 300 Javanese women to work as "comfort women".

Tarakan oil field production reached 350,000 barrels per month by early 1944, but Japan no longer had enough oil tankers to transport this volume to Japanese refineries. Without adequate supplies of refined residual fuel oil for the Battle of the Philippine Sea, Japanese aircraft carriers refueled with unrefined Tarakan crude oil in June 1944. The undesalted crude oil damaged boiler tubes, and the unremoved naphtha fraction volatilized to form explosive atmospheres contributing to the loss of the aircraft carriers Taihō, Shōkaku, and Hiyō.  The last Japanese tanker left Tarakan in July 1944; Allied bombing raids damaged the oil field facilities later that year; and the veteran Australian 26th Brigade Group ended Japanese occupation with the second Battle of Tarakan from 1 May–21 June 1945.

Independence Era
Following the Indonesian revolution in the late 1940s, Tarakan became part of the new republic. It was administrated as a district following a Presidential Decree Number 22, 1963. In 1981, Tarakan was granted a city charter, at that time one of four cities in East Kalimantan, along with Samarinda, Balikpapan and Bontang in accordance with Government Law Number 47, 1981.

The city witnessed the Tarakan riot in 2010 following a clash between Buginese migrants from neighboring Sulawesi island and the Tidung people. The two groups later agreed to a peace deal, mediated by local police and the governor of then-East Kalimantan, Awang Faroek Ishak. After North Kalimantan was established as a province in 2012, Tarakan became the sole city within the new province. In 2015, the city witnessed another riot, this time related to the 2015 North Kalimantan gubernatorial election between the candidates' supporters.

Demographics 
Tarakan had a population of 193,370 at the 2010 Census, but the 2020 Census this had grown to 242,786. Indigenous residents include the Tidung, a subgroup of the Dayak people. In addition, the city also has a multi-ethnic population from other parts of Indonesia, such as Bugis, Javanese and Chinese Indonesians. 85% of the city's population is Muslim, around 10% are Christian, 1.3% Hindu, 0.04% Buddhist, and 0.03% Confucianist.

Population growth averaged 2.23% per year in the decade 2010-2020. The city population has increased rapidly which is thought to be caused by high urbanization rate with people moving in from neighbouring regions. The sex ratio as of 2020 was 100:109—100 females for every 109 males. The city is dominated by a young and reproductive age population above the age of 15, which accounts around 64.53% of city's population. Life expectancy in the city as of 2020 was 74 years, which is considerably higher than both the provincial and national average; it has been increasing consistently.

Infrastructure

Health 

The island's main healthcare infrastructure consists of four hospitals, eight puskesmas (health clinics), and 103 healthcare centers. In addition, there are seven mobile puskesmas, the biggest being Tarakan Regional Hospital, owned by the city government, located in Central Tarakan district. It is also the only international-class hospital in the province and is the province's referral hospital.

There is also a navy hospital, owned by the Indonesian Navy, located in West Tarakan district.

Education 
There are 27 kindergartens, 65 elementary schools, 21 junior high schools and 12 senior high schools. There are also five institutions of higher education in the city, the most notable being Borneo Tarakan University, which is also the only public university in the city and the province.

There are also seven vocational high schools. School participation rate is around 99% as of 2020.

Places of worship 

There are 235 mosques, 93 churches, four Chinese Buddhist temples, and one Hindu temple. One of the biggest mosques, Al-Ma'arif Grand Mosque, was constructed in 1961 and is located in the Central Tarakan district. The only Hindu temple in the city, Pura Giri Jagat Nata, was inaugurated on 1994, and is used mostly by Balinese migrants. The Tarakan Islamic Center functions not only as a mosque but is also used for Islamic learning and various Islamic events. A popular local tourist spot, it was inaugurated in 2012.

Communication 
The city has access to 4G and other telecommunication services. As with most Indonesian cities, the only fiber optic service provider in the city is IndiHome, which is state-owned under Telkomsel. The city has fiber optic cables connected to Balikpapan and Samarinda, which also serve other regencies of North Kalimantan province.

Transportation 
Several ferries serve Tarakan, linking it to other cities of eastern Borneo: Nunukan in North Kalimantan, Berau and Balikpapan in East Kalimantan, and Tawau in Sabah. The port also provides links to cities on other Indonesian islands—Sulawesi and Java.

The airport handles domestic flight routes to Balikpapan, Jakarta, Surabaya, Denpasar and Makassar, as well as an international route to Tawau, Malaysia. On 2016, the airport terminal was expanded to provide for more than 2,000 passengers per day. The city has a bus rapid transit system which connects the entire city. In addition, there are s (shared taxis) and online motorcycle taxi services provided by firms like Gojek and Grab, and conventional taxis.

There is a plan to build a bridge connecting the island to mainland Kalimantan, which is currently delayed because of the government refocusing fund allocations from development and infrastructure to COVID-19 pandemic mitigation.

Economy

The city was once a leading oil producer in the Dutch East Indies; to-day however, oil only comprises six percent of the total Tarakan economy. Fisheries and processed products now dominate the economy. The city is still the biggest contributor to the North Kalimantan economy, contributing  37.05 percent. The economic growth in 2015 was 7.52 percent, which is above the national average. The unemployment rate in 2019 was 4.78 percent. There are 14 companies based in Tarakan as of 2019. As a result, in 2021 it is the 17th richest city in Indonesia. The poverty rate as of 2020 was around 6 percent.

The agriculture sector is small, with only  being cultivated as paddy fields. It has been declining massively since 2018, with drops as high as 45.81 percent of crop yields. Tourism has been a growing sector, with around 227,638 tourists visiting the city in 2019. There are 33 registered banks in the city as of 2020, consisting of 23 public banks and 10 private banking institutions.

Governance

Administrative Districts 
The city is divided into four districts (kecamatan), tabulated below with their land areas and their populations at the 2010 census and 2020 Census. The table also includes the number of administrative villages (rural desa and urban kelurahan) in each district, and its postal codes.

Local Government 
As with all Indonesian cities, it is a second-level administrative division run by a mayor and vice mayor together with the city parliament, and it has a status equivalent to a regency. Executive power lies in the mayor and vice mayor, while legislative duties are carried out by local parliaments. The mayor, vice mayor, and parliament members are democratically elected by the people of the city in an election. The heads of districts are appointed directly by the city mayor with recommendations by the city secretary.

Politics 

Tarakan city is part of 1st electoral district for provincial parliament (North Kalimantan People's Representative Council), and have 12 out of 35 representatives there. In city level, it has its own parliament consist of 30 representatives divided into four electoral districts. The last election for parliament was on 17 April 2019 and the next one will be in the year 2024.

Climate
Tarakan has a tropical rainforest climate (Af) with heavy rainfall year-round.

See also

 List of regencies and cities of Indonesia

References

 
Cities in Indonesia
Populated places in Indonesia
Islands of Indonesia